Rev. David Wiley (1768 – October 14, 1812) was an American surveyor, politician, writer, scientist, and Presbyterian minister who served as postmaster and mayor of Georgetown, District of Columbia.

Biography

Early life and ministry 
David Wiley was born in 1768 in Pennsylvania. He graduated from the College of New Jersey (later Princeton) in 1788. From 1788 to 1789, Wiley was a tutor at Hampden Sidney College in Virginia. Wiley married Susan Wynnkoop and they had four children. 

Wiley was ordained as a Presbyterian minister by the Presbytery of Huntingdon on April 9, 1794, and installed as pastor of two congregations in Centre County, Cedar Creek and Spring Creek. 

During this period, Wiley also served as the first stated clerk of the Presbytery. He served subsequent congregations and in temporary vacancies until April 1801, when he requested and obtained permission to move to the Presbytery of Baltimore, which covered a wide region that included Virginia.

Academic and political career 
In 1801, Wiley was requested by Stephen Bloomer Balch to move to Georgetown to succeed him as the principal and headmaster of a private school, the Columbian Academy. Wiley also taught several subjects at the academy, including philosophy, mathematics, geography, and Greek. His pupils included Thomas Bloomer Balch.

In 1802, Wiley wrote to President Thomas Jefferson encouraging the appointment of his friend William R. Cozens to be the first Librarian of Congress.

According to The Papers of Thomas Jefferson, in October 1804, Wiley, along with Abraham Bradley Jr., made a series of astronomical observations near the White House to determine its longitude and latitude. 

In 1805, President Jefferson considered appointing Wiley as a leader of the Red River Expedition of the Southwestern United States.

Wiley served as the secretary of the Columbian Agricultural Society. 

In 1806, Wiley was elected as a trustee of the Presbyterian Church in Georgetown. He also served as a voting member of the Presbyterian General Assembly.

From 1810 to 1813, Wiley was the first editor of the Agricultural Museum, the first agricultural periodical magazine published in the United States. The magazine discouraged excessive importation in the United States and included Thomas Jefferson among its readers.

Wiley served as Georgetown's postmaster and was appointed by the United States Congress to serve as Turnpike commissioner from 1809 to 1811. From 1811 to 1812, served a one-year term as mayor of Georgetown, succeeding Thomas Corcoran.

Death 
Wiley died on October 14, 1812, while staying at Jordan's Inn in Fayetteville, North Carolina. He had been traveling to the region on a government survey.

Legacy 
An 1801 painting of Wiley by Charles Peale Polk is in the permanent collection of the National Portrait Gallery.

References

Bibliography 

 
 
 
 
 

1768 births
1812 deaths
American editors
American Presbyterian ministers
Schoolteachers from Washington, D.C.
Mayors of places in the District of Columbia